Long intergenic non-protein coding RNA 899 is a protein that in humans is encoded by the LINC00899 gene.

References 

Human proteins